In computational biology, a Cellular Potts model (CPM, also known as the Glazier-Graner-Hogeweg model) is a computational model of cells and tissues. It is used to simulate individual and collective cell behavior, tissue morphogenesis and cancer development. CPM describes cells as deformable objects with a certain volume, that can adhere to each other and to the medium in which they live. The formalism can be extended to include cell behaviours such as cell migration, growth and division, and cell signalling. The first CPM was proposed for the simulation of cell sorting by François Graner and James Glazier as a modification of a large-Q Potts model. CPM was then popularized by Paulien Hogeweg for studying morphogenesis.
Although the model was developed to describe biological cells, it can also be used to model individual parts of a biological cell, or even regions of fluid.

Model description 

The CPM consists of a rectangular Euclidean lattice, where each cell is a subset of lattice sites sharing the same cell ID (analogous to spin in Potts models in physics). Lattice sites that are not occupied by cells are the medium. The dynamics of the model are governed by an energy function: the Hamiltonian which describes the energy of a particular configuration of cells in the lattice. In a basic CPM, this energy results from adhesion between cells and resistance of cells to volume changes. The algorithm for updating CPM  minimizes this energy. 

In order to evolve the model Metropolis-style updates are performed, that is:
 choose a random lattice site 
 choose a random neighboring lattice site  to copy its ID into .
 calculate the difference in energy between the original and the proposed new configuration.
 accept or reject this copy event based on the change in energy , as follows: 
 if the new energy is lower, always accept the copy;
 if the new energy is higher, accept the copy with probability  (the  Boltzmann temperature  determines the likelihood of energetically unfavorable fluctuations).

The Hamiltonian 
The original model proposed by Graner and Glazier contains cells of two types, with different adhesion energies for cells of the same type and cells of a different type. Each cell type also has a different contact energy with the medium, and the cell volume is assumed to remain close to a target value. The Hamiltonian is formulated as:

where ,  are lattice sites, σi is the cell at site i, τ(σ) is the cell type of cell σ, J is the coefficient determining the adhesion between two cells of types τ(σ),τ(σ'), δ is the Kronecker delta, v(σ) is the volume of cell σ, V(σ) is the target volume, and λ is a Lagrange multiplier determining the strength of the volume constraint.

Cells with a lower J value for their membrane contact will stick together more strongly. Therefore, different patterns of cell sorting can be simulated by varying the J values.

Extensions 
Over time, the CPM has evolved from a specific model of cell sorting to a general framework with many extensions, some of which are partially or entirely off-lattice. Various cell behaviours, such as chemotaxis, elongation and haptotaxis can be incorporated by extending either the Hamiltonian, H, or the change in energy . Auxiliary sub-lattices may be used to include additional spatial information, such as the concentrations of chemicals.

Chemotaxis 

The chemokine gradient is typically implemented on a separate lattice of the same dimensions as the cell lattice.

Multiscale and hybrid modeling using CPM 
Core GGH (or CPM) algorithm which defines the evolution of the cellular level structures can easily be integrated with intracellular signaling dynamics, reaction diffusion dynamics and rule based model to account for the processes which happen at lower (or higher) time scale. Open source software Bionetsolver can be used to integrate intracellular dynamics with CPM algorithm.

References

External links
James Glazier (professional website)
CompuCell3D, a CPM simulation environment: Sourceforge
SimTK
Notre Dame development site
Artificial Life model of multicellular morphogenesis with autonomously generated gradients for positional information using the Cellular Potts model
 Stochastic cellular automata

Statistical mechanics
Lattice models
Stochastic models